Equatorial Guinea competed at the 2019 African Games held from 19 to 31 August 2019 in Rabat, Morocco.

3x3 basketball 

Equatorial Guinea competed in 3x3 basketball in both the men's tournament and women's tournament. In both tournaments the teams lost the majority of their matches.

Athletics 

Athletes representing Equatorial Guinea competed in the men's 100 metres, men's 200 metres, women's 200 metres, men's 800 metres, men's 1500 metres and men's long jump events.

Boxing 

Four athletes competed in boxing: Armando Moliko, Mary Eyang, Raúl Obama and Toribio Koca.

Football 

Equatorial Guinea women's national under-20 football team competed in the women's tournament at the 2019 African Games. The team did not advance to the semi-finals.

Karate 

Expedito Elá and Lisardo Perico Sabana competed in karate.

Swimming 

Two swimmers were scheduled to compete but neither competed in their scheduled events: Diosdado Joaquín Miko Eyenga and Pilar Asangono.

Taekwondo 

Jesús Boko and Verónica Mbang competed in Taekwondo. Both were eliminated in the first round.

Tennis 

Francisco Boesi competed in the men's singles event. He lost his only match against Charles Alipoe-Tchotchodji (representing Togo).

María Jesús Ayingono competed in the women's singles event. She lost her only match against Allyson Onya (representing Democratic Republic of the Congo).

References 

Nations at the 2019 African Games
2019
African Games